General elections were held in the Pitcairn Islands on 12 November 2013. Shawn Christian was elected mayor, Brenda Christian was elected deputy mayor, and five candidates were elected to the Island Council.

Results

Mayor

Deputy Mayor

Island Council

References

Pitcairn
Pitcairn
General election
Elections in the Pitcairn Islands
Pitcairn general election,2013
November 2013 events in Oceania